Hrašče is a small village in the upper Vipava Valley, on the western slopes of Mount Nanos, in the Municipality of Vipava in the Littoral region of Slovenia.

References

External links 
Hrašče at Geopedia

Populated places in the Municipality of Vipava